Aftermath is a 2010 Canadian-American documentary television series created by History Canada and produced by Cream Productions. It aired on National Geographic in the United States.

Aftermath consists of thought experiments looking at what would happen to Earth if extremely distant events and changes occurred in the present. The series is a follow-up to the TV special Aftermath: Population Zero.

In 2010, the series was nominated for a 2010 Gemini Award for best documentary.

Episodes

The World After Humans/Population Zero

The series' pilot special, this episode hypothesizes what would happen if all humans suddenly disappeared from Earth.

World Without Oil

This episode hypothesizes a total oil depletion scenario, where almost all oil on Earth simply vanishes in one night.

Alarms in oil rigs sound as pipe pressure plummets, leading employees and chemists around the globe to discover the bizarre situation as it unfolds. One day after oil, asphalt, diesel, gasoline, and tar supplies become limited. This causes $2 trillion USD of stock to become worthless, and oil workers are dismissed as the industry fails. Consumers rush to gas stations to fuel their cars for the last time, while oil tankers are called back to their countries of origin to save national reserves of oil. All international transportation is grounded, including logistics, meaning resources such as steel, food, medical supplies, and trash are not being moved.

Five days after oil, power stations start running out of diesel, sparking widespread outages. Martial law is declared to stop rioting and looting. Unemployment rises to 30%. Livestock die due to lack of food. Coal, which is still accessible, briefly becomes the main source of fuel, but they quickly face shortages. Thirty days after oil, diesel-powered passenger trains are running on rations, and the roads are empty of cars. Governments start biofuel planting programs, while nations that already produced large amounts of biofuel are able to mitigate the negative effects of losing oil.

Five months after oil, the Big Three automobile manufacturers are nationalized by the U.S. government. Famine and drug-resistant infections threaten death, while many begin to migrate as food shipments come every second day. Emergency vehicles are still given fuel rations. Stockpiled gasoline begins to degrade in quality due to it being stored in poor conditions, and civilians begin to experiment with chemicals to produce their own biofuel. While some governments embrace the use of biofuel and begin mass production, others start to wonder if they should plant crops for food or fuel, eventually abandoning biofuel planting altogether.

One year after oil, emergency vehicles are operated either by lithium battery or biofuel. The price of lithium then shoots up, becoming a valuable commodity and creating jobs in industries revolving around the element. Populations of wild animals bounce back. In the countryside, more people practice subsistence farming, growing their own food, keeping livestock and hunting.

Ten years after oil, artificial satellites burn up in the atmosphere as maintaining them is of a reduced priority. Old and obsolete electronics are scavenged for precious metals as people recycle on a massive scale. Algae is used as a biofuel. Trucks deliver vital supplies to hospitals, indirectly improving life expectancy.

Forty years after oil, the skies are much clearer and cleaner as pollutants are washed out. Most vehicles now run on biofuel. Lithium battery cars are expensive, resulting in a re-emergence of public transportation and railways, and new towns grow along railway points. Some cities are eventually abandoned, but many others thrive. A world trade based on biofuel and lithium grows. Eventually, lithium supplies begin to run out, but balancing this with biofuel production means humanity is able to prosper once again.

Population Overload

This episode hypothesizes an overpopulation scenario where the human population of Earth doubles from 7 billion to 14 billion in one night.

The governments of the world attempt to cope at first by ordering the construction of gigantic high rise apartment complexes. However, the often outdated public works systems cannot handle this vastly increased load; bridges break and sewers fail, leading to contamination of the water supply. Much of the remaining woodlands of the earth are cleared to form new farms and housing. Emergency rationing becomes commonplace, and grain exporters stop their exports, leading to a drastic shortage in nations that relied on them. Even in wealthy countries, food and water resources are strained by the doubled population. Electrical grids have difficulty keeping up with the increased demand. New coal plants are built to relieve the pressure, but they result in drastically increased air pollution.

Water shortages become rampant, with insufficient water available for drinking or farming, and desalination plants are built. Looting leads to martial law in many countries. People in countries that lack water and food begin leaving the country in search of resources, prompting unprecedented human migration. Some countries such as the U.S. close their borders to refugees, while others are more accepting and attempt to help them. In the U.S., many people head to the Great Lakes, forming massive tent cities. A population crash begins, resulting in the die-off of billions of people due to the carrying capacity being exceeded.

Despite the grim outlook for humanity, thirty years after the doubling event, the population crash concludes. The total human population stabilizes at 4 billion, similar to the human population in the mid-1970s.

When the Earth Stops Spinning

This episode hypothesizes a scenario where the rotation of the Earth begins slowing dramatically, eventually coming to a complete stop. Though the actual rotation of the Earth is slowing, it is so slow it does not affect life in the present day; in this scenario, Earth would stop spinning in as little as five years.

The first effect is the isolation between GPS satellites and atomic clocks. Stock markets crash due to humanity's uncertain future. As time goes on, the oceanic bulge of water at the equator moves northward and southward, flooding Russia, Canada, Antarctica, and Northern Europe. The atmosphere, once shaking solar heat out over the world and shifting air, stops and whirls to the poles. The atmosphere starts to thin at the equator, and people migrate to more northerly and southerly cities to keep up with denser air. There is a higher risk of solar radiation as the magnetosphere weakens because of the slowing inner core.

As the Earth slows, the planet's crust, mantle, and core slow down at different speeds. The massive friction from reduced rotational speed creates tremendous earthquakes where there have never been earthquakes before. Humans and other animals start suffering from sleep fatigue as their bodies cannot properly work in a day longer than 60 hours. The new oceans at the poles begin to flood the contiguous United States and Southern Europe. As the ocean water has moved to the poles, the sea recedes from around the equator, revealing a new supercontinent spanning the entire equator.

Eventually, the Earth stops spinning altogether and its position becomes fixed with respect to the background stars, and as a result still experiences a day-night cycle synonymous with an entire year. The scorching day lasts for six months, while the remaining six months of the year are a lengthy cold, dark night. The planetary landscape now consists of one ocean approximately 10 miles deep in the north, another vast ocean in the south, and a vast girdle of land that spans the equator in its entirety. The equatorial supercontinent is surrounded by scattered giant islands, areas of the old continents not inundated by the sea. Most of the new continent is uninhabitable due to thin air, but the former ocean floor has sufficient air pressure for human life. A team of scientists set sail for the supercontinent, but harsh storms near the equator wreck their boat and wash the survivors ashore, where they face an uncertain future.

Survivors living in the Midwestern United States are safe from flooding and have sufficient air pressure to sustain human habitability, but in the new stable climate of the still Earth, whose axis remains tilted, resulting in different areas of the planet experiencing permanent seasonal conditions depending on their location during the six-month days, little to no precipitation occurs, putting the people at great risk; additionally, because the electricity supply has collapsed due to the flooding, the survivors are unable to desalinate the oceans for water for several years. The possibility of finding food remains as fish live in larger numbers. Survivors living in Hawaii, now part of the new equatorial supercontinent, are notably better off because they live about 1,000 miles north from the edge of the sun's path, receiving sufficient amounts of water from rain to last the year and having safer methods of fishing.

Red Giant/Swallowed by the Sun
This episode hypothesizes a scenario where the Sun expands into a red giant. Though this is expected to be a gradual process, taking billions of years as the Sun ages and the hydrogen fusion in its core diminishes, in this scenario the Sun rapidly ages and expands in the present day.

The Sun gradually becomes hotter as the hydrogen at its core is consumed through nuclear fusion, resulting in the accumulation of helium, which causes the remaining hydrogen to fuse faster to maintain radiation pressure against the sun's gravity. The average global temperature goes up by 36 °F (20 °C).

At , hot enough to boil water, humans and animals are blinded and suffocated as the alveoli in their lungs are cooked. Earth's magnetosphere begins to weaken. Animals without lungs survive longer, but eventually also succumb to the heat. Humans move underground to survive, and to explore the Earth's surface, humans have to wear space suits. At , water begins to evaporate much faster than it does today. The concentration of water vapor increases in the atmosphere, displacing oxygen, but despite the intense heat, oxygen levels become so low that fires cannot start. Rain evaporates before reaching the ground.

At , all life on Earth is rendered extinct, even those living underground. All water on Earth evaporates, turning the former ocean floors into salt pans. The air pressure resulting from the vaporized oceans increases to 4,000 pounds per square inch, destroying even pressurized containers. Anything made of plastic or other synthetic materials melts, and concrete deteriorates as the water inside it evaporates explosively, resulting in buildings collapsing into dust. Oxygen levels shoot back up after the water molecules are split into hydrogen and oxygen due to the sun's increased ultraviolet radiation, and the lighter hydrogen escapes to space. Earth turns red as the new oxygen reacts with the iron in the Earth's crust to produce iron oxide, covering the planet in rust. The return of oxygen also causes spontaneous combustion to consume any remaining flammable materials.

At , stone structures such as Stonehenge and the Egyptian pyramids melt, destroying the last remaining proof of life on Earth; the Earth's crust melts as well. The Sun eventually enters its red giant phase as the last of its hydrogen is consumed, and temperatures at its core reach the point where the helium begins to fuse. As the Sun expands, Mercury and Venus are swallowed, and Earth's orbit slows. Earth, now a planet-sized ball of molten magma, spirals toward the Sun and is swallowed by it, finally destroying all that's left. The Sun stops expanding before it reaches the orbit of Mars, the sole survivor of the inner planets and now the only rocky planet in the entire solar system. Surprisingly, humans and a number of species they brought with them survive, as some were able to escape Earth prior to all life on the planet being rendered extinct. The episode ends with the survivors establishing new settlements on the moons of the gas giant planets, which now lie within the Sun's habitable zone.

See also
Life After People
The World Without Us

References

External links

 History Television: Aftermath
 National Geographic Channel: Aftermath
 

2010 Canadian television series debuts
Documentary films about environmental issues
Human extinction
National Geographic (American TV channel) original programming
2010s Canadian documentary television series
Thought experiments